GNU Prolog (also called gprolog) is a compiler developed by Daniel Diaz with an interactive debugging environment for Prolog available for Unix, Windows, Mac OS X and Linux. It also supports some extensions to Prolog including constraint programming over a finite domain, parsing using definite clause grammars, and an operating system interface.

The compiler converts the source code into byte code that can be interpreted by a Warren abstract machine (WAM) and converts that to standalone executables.

See also

SWI-Prolog

References

External links

Prolog programming language family
Constraint programming
Prolog
Free compilers and interpreters
Programming tools for Windows
Unix programming tools